Mobile is the last album from Beaver, and one of the last released on Man's Ruin Records. Thus, it is out of print.

Track listing
 "Private Stash"
 "At The Mirror Palace"
 "End Of A Rope"
 "Cir"
 "Liberator"
 "9 Lives"
 "Immaterialized"
 "Hour Glass"

Credits
Recorded at 'The Void', Eindhoven, The Netherlands.

Produced by Pidah

References 

Beaver (band) albums
2001 albums
Man's Ruin Records albums